Richard Malcolm Walker  (born ) is the Executive Chairman of the privately owned British Iceland supermarket chain of predominately frozen food retailers. He is the son of founder Malcolm Walker and qualified as a Chartered Surveyor, prior to joining Iceland. In 2023, he revealed he is a Conservative Party candidate to stand for election to the House of Commons.

Personal life
Walker was born in 1980 or 1981 and is the son of Malcolm Walker, who founded Iceland in 1970. He graduated in geography from Durham University in 2001, and qualified as a Chartered Surveyor. He is married with two children.

He is chair of the environmental campaign group Surfers Against Sewage.

When invited by New Scientist in 2021 to choose one of the "best popular science books" he nominated Enric Sala's The Nature of Nature.  

He has said that the best advice he has been given was from his father, who said "Never, ever, ever, ever give up".

Career
Walker co-founded the property company Bywater in 2006, naming it after the street where he lived at the time.  he is still its chair though he stepped back from day-to-day involvement in 2013. 

He joined Iceland, which his father Malcolm Walker had founded in 1970, after his father regained control of the company in 2012. He worked on the shop floor and in store management before becoming managing director.

In 2021 he published The Green Grocer, which recounted his career and his ideas about business and the environment. Chris Packham described it as "A remarkable insight: honest, pragmatic, hopeful and realistic", and the Financial Times' reviewer called it "an honest and positive book".

Controversy
Walker has been the subject of criticism for espousing environmental values while engaging in practices such as using a company helicopter for travel purposes.

Recognition
In 2021, Walker was made an honorary fellow of University College London. 

Walker was appointed Officer of the Order of the British Empire (OBE) in the 2022 Birthday Honours for services to business and the environment.

Selected publications

References

1980s births
Living people
People associated with University College London
British businesspeople
21st-century British businesspeople
British businesspeople in retailing
British real estate businesspeople
Officers of the Order of the British Empire
Alumni of St Aidan's College, Durham